Electron is a suburb of Johannesburg, South Africa. It is located in Region F of the City of Johannesburg Metropolitan Municipality.

History
Prior to the discovery of gold on the Witwatersrand in 1886, the suburb lay on land on one of the original farms called Elandsfontein. It became a suburb on 27 July 1949.

References

Johannesburg Region F